Fino a qui tutto bene may refer to:

 a 2010 album by Marracash
 a 2014 film also known as So Far So Good